Maxwell Hamilton Osbiston (7 August 1914 – 12 March 1981) was an Australian actor, active in radio, stage, film and television.

Biography
Osbiston was born in Sydney, the son of Frank and Iolanthe Osbiston (née Margoliouth) of Cremorne, New South Wales.

He spent three years at the Agricultural School at Yanco, followed by North Sydney High School. He left school during the Great Depression, and with difficulty found employment delivering bread, and spent some time panning for gold in the Central West.
On his return to Sydney he found employment as a traveler for a firm selling dentists' supplies, and remained in this business for four years.

He had been attracted to the stage from schooldays, and in 1935 joined Doris Fitton's Independent Theatre, appearing in The Late Christopher Bean (Emlyn Williams) in October 1935, The Three Sisters (Anton Chekhov) in September 1936, Hassan (James Elroy Flecker) in March 1937, and Boy Meets Girl (Samuel and Bella Spewack) in November 1937. During much of this time he was also acting in radio plays for the Australian Broadcasting Commission, and in January 1938 he was signed to a one-year contract. His most enduring, though minor, role was in Blue Hills as Dr Peter Frobisher. He was one of three (with Patricia Crocker and Queenie Ashton) who took part in both the first and last episodes (28 February 1949 and 30 September 1976).

His professional stage career started with a small part in Of Mice and Men at the Minerva, which did not go unnoticed, and followed with French Without Tears at the same theatre, for which he received the highest accolades. Both plays were produced by Harvey Adams.

Osbiston served with the RAAF during WWII, but details are hard to find, though he may have attained the rank of flight lieutenant.

Osbiston married Beulah "Babs" Mayhew of Ermington, New South Wales sometime around early 1939. They had appeared together as a couple in the radio series As Ye Sow, and continued to work on the same shows wherever possible, Mrs Osbiston continuing to appear as "Babs Mayhew".

Max Osbiston was a cousin of film editor Alan Brigstocke Osbiston (7 May 1914 – 1971) — see chart below.

Selected appearances

Radio
Osbiston had roles in literally hundreds of radio dramas, including:
 The Square Ring (1965 radio adaptation)
 Dad and Dave from Snake Gully series

Film
 The Power and the Glory (1941) - Flight Leader
 The Phantom Stockman (1953) - Frank McLeod
 His Majesty O'Keefe (1954)
 The Sundowners (1960) - Farm Couple
 Bungala Boys (1961) - Reg Phelan
 27A (1974) - Frederick Parsons
 Little Boy Lost (1978) - Insp. James

Television
 Act of Violence (1959, TV Movie)
 Thunder on Sycamore Street (1960, TV Movie)
 The Square Ring (1960, TV Movie)
 Around the World in Eighty Days (1972-1973, Osbiston was one of the largely Australian) - Mr Fix, the saboteur (voice) (not a detective as in the original).
 Case for the Defence (1978, Series)

Family
Three children of Samuel Osbiston of Ryburgh, Norfolk, England found their way to Australia. Several descendants were prominent in banking, mining and the arts in Sydney:
 Frank Frederic Osbiston (c. 1843 – 23 April 1902) mine manager; worked in America, died at Coolgardie, Western Australia.
 Robert Osbiston of Campbelltown (c. 1846 – 16 November 1898) economist, secretary of the Bankers Institute, married Sarah Elizabeth Ann "Annie" Finch on 23 December 1871 in Chelsea, London.
(Robert) Newton Osbiston (c. 1872 – 24 February 1902) married Susan Jane "Susie" Allison on 7 February 1900. She married again, to Arthur Smith of Cheviot Hills Station, Drake, New South Wales
Frances Allison Osbiston ( – ) married Alexander Wyatt Martin on 19 February 1927
Ann Osbiston (1874–1964) 
Francis "Frank" Osbiston (16 September 1876 – 16 May 1953). He married Iolanthe Yolande Lindsay Margoliouth of New Zealand on 23 December 1911, lived at Cremorne.
Francis Robert "Bob" Osbiston (25 January 1913 – ) served as war correspondent for the Sydney Truth and Daily Mirror. He married Winifred Joan Collins, daughter of painter and broadcaster Albert Collins, on 30 April 1938 and had two children. They divorced in 1946. She married again, to Neville Ballard Lewis on 16 February 1948.
Maxwell Hamilton Osbiston (7 August 1914 – 12 March 1981) married Beulah "Babs" Mayhew (died 2004) early in 1939.
daughter (18 July 1944 – )
Karen Osbiston (c. 1946 – )
Judith Lindsay Osbiston (5 September 1917 – ) married John Rorke, lived in Arcadia, New South Wales. 
David John Osbiston (5 October 1918 – 18 September 1996)
Michael Osbiston ( – ) youngest son of Frank, was another actor. (Check SMH 26 May 1962 p.68)
Charles Alan Osbiston (c. 1881–c. 1957) married Emily Florence Brigstocke on 6 July 1912
Alan Brigstocke Osbiston (7 May 1914 – 1971) of Chatswood married Lyla Cranston on 17 June 1943
William Osbiston (c. July 1883 – 16 November 1939) served with 1st AIF
 Maude Osbiston (c. 1850 – 16 April 1923), died at Waterfall, New South Wales

References 

1914 births
1981 deaths
Australian male radio actors
Australian male stage actors
Australian male film actors
Australian male television actors